Anisotenes stemmatostola is a species of moth of the family Tortricidae. It is found in New Guinea, which is an island in Oceania.

References

Moths described in 1952
Anisotenes
Moths of New Guinea
Taxa named by Alexey Diakonoff